The Mysteries of Paris is a 1922 French silent serial film drama directed by Charles Burguet and starring Huguette Duflos and Georges Lannes.

It is based on the novel The Mysteries of Paris by Eugène Sue. The serial ran in twelve installments.

Cast

References

Bibliography

External links 
 

1922 films
French silent feature films
1920s French-language films
Films directed by Charles Burguet
French black-and-white films
French drama films
1922 drama films
Silent drama films
1920s French films